This is a list of programs that have been, are being, or will be broadcast by Television Sydney, 31 Melbourne, Brisbane 31, 44 Adelaide, Perth Television and Darwin 44 along with other former Community channels.

Current and former programming

0–9
1700

B
The Bazura Project
Blokesworld

D
Darren and Brose
The Darren Sanders Show

E
Eastern Newsbeat

F
Fishcam

H
Here's Humphrey
Hot Dog with the Lot

I
In Pit Lane

K
KO Boxing
KO Fight Night

L
Level 3
Live on Bowen

M
The Marngrook Footy Show
MCM
Melbourne International Comedy Festival 2017

O
Ocean Girl

P
Pete Boone, Private Eye
 Prisoner

R
Raucous
Russian Kaleidoscope

S
Salam Cafe
Saturday Night Darren & Brose
Studio A

U
Under Melbourne Tonight

V
Vasili's Garden
 Vasili’s Garden To Kitchen

W
Wake Up! WA
What's Goin' On There?
Whose Shout

See also
 List of Australian television series
 List of longest running Australian television series
 List of Australian television news services

References

C31 programs
Australian community access television shows
Channel 31
C31